A labour festival (in the US, 'labor festival') is a festival related to the labour movement usually occurring annually. Labour festivals are some of the biggest political gatherings in Europe. Often they are outdoors in the summer and (more akin to a Fête) they incorporate music, (particularly brass band), parades, film, historical commemoration and food and drink. One of the well-known ones is Durham Miners' Gala attended by some 100,000 attendees. Some are run by communist or socialist parties such as Fête de l'Humanité, Fête de Lutte Ouvrière, Avante! Festival, Odigitis festival and Festa Democratica. Some were formerly so, such as  Edinburgh Labour People's Festival. Some commemorate trade unionism or history such as Burston Strike School and Tolpuddle Martyrs festival. Glastonbury Festival has a The Left Field and has been addressed by Labour leaders.

Events

References

Cultural festivals
Festival
 a